Manilal Jethabhai Vaghela is an Indian politician from Gujarat.

Political career
Vaghela was elected as a member of Gujarat Legislative Assembly from Vadgam in 2012 as a candidate of the Indian National Congress (INC). When INC supported independent candidate Jignesh Mevani from Vadgam in 2017 Gujarat Legislative Assembly election, he was moved to contest as an INC candidate from Idar where he was defeated. He resigned from INC in November 2021 and joined Bharatiya Janata Party (BJP) in April 2022. He contested 2022 Gujarat Legislative Assembly election from Vadgam as a BJP candidate but was defeated by his nearest rival and INC candidate Jignesh Mevani.

References

Bharatiya Janata Party politicians from Gujarat
Indian National Congress politicians from Gujarat
Gujarat MLAs 2012–2017
Year of birth missing (living people)
Living people
Former members of Indian National Congress from Gujarat